The Motopark Raceway is a motorsport venue in Eastern Finland, Virtasalmi, Pieksämäki municipality. The track is 
The area also includes a  drag racing strip.

The track was opened in 1987 and was the first motor stadium in Finland meant only for drag racing. The stadium area was enlarged in 1990s, when asphalt and rallycross tracks were constructed.

Lap records

The official race lap records at the Motopark Raceway are listed as:

References

External links 
Official website

Motorsport venues in Finland
Drag racing venues in Europe